The Beverly Hills Courier is a free weekly tabloid-sized print newspaper of circulation in Beverly Hills and the surrounding communities, and a daily web newspaper.

History
The publication was founded by March Schwartz in 1965. His staff included managing editor Arthur M. Goldberg from 1966 to 2003. Both individuals were products of the long-defunct evening companion newspaper to the Los Angeles Times, the Los Angeles Mirror, where Schwartz was the classified sales manager and Goldberg was the editor. In 2004, the Courier'''s then-editor, Norma Zager, was awarded Journalist of the Year by the Los Angeles Press Club for her series on a lawsuit brought by Erin Brockovich.

In 2004, after suffering a debilitating stroke, Schwartz reluctantly sold The Courier to The San Marino Tribune Company, Inc. whose owner, attorney Clifton S. Smith, Jr., assumed the role of publisher of the Courier. Smith staffed the newspaper with former The Hollywood Reporter columnist George Christy whose Courier column has appeared  on foxnews.com. Guest columnists included Joan Rivers. The late Rabbi Jacob Pressman also published a weekly column. Courier articles have been cited by the Los Angeles Times.

The Courier subscribes to Agence France-Presse and City News Service. Its website features updates throughout the day, seven days a week. The entire print edition is also available from the website.  The paper is delivered free to residences each Friday. As of 2013, it self-reports a circulation of 40,000.

Smith sold the Courier to entrepreneur Paula Kent Meehan, co-founder of the Redken hair-care company, in April 2014 – just two months before Meehan's death. Associate publisher Marcia Wilson Hobbs replaced Smith as the publisher.  BH Courier Acquisition, LLC acquired the "Courier" from the estate of Paula Kent Meehan in September, 2019.

Reception
The Courier has been described as "conservative" by LA Weekly blogger Dennis Romero in a city which is "heavily liberal and Democratic".Josh E. Gross, publisher of the competing Beverly Hills Weekly, described Clifton S. Smith Jr., the Courier's then owner/publisher, as "right-wing" and "bombastic".  A 2013 Los Angeles Times article about the Courier noted that "Smith delivers his opinions on civic matters in the heavily Democratic city through tart editorials that lean libertarian."

The Los Angeles County Metropolitan Transportation Authority has criticized the Courier for publishing errors and misleading statements with regards to the Westside Subway Extension. Damien Newton of LA streetsblog has accused the Courier of publishing libel with its coverage of seismology experts who weighed in on the geotechnical issues facing the subway extension.

Two-time Beverly Hills mayor Barry Brucker accused the Courier of being biased in its coverage of the local city government and various development projects. Then-Beverly Hills City Manager, Jeff Kolin, accused the Courier of printing false allegations with regard to an article alleging city staff had falsified documents concerning city water rates, and has rebuked the paper for being misleading by confounding the city's 2012 budgetary surplus with unfunded pension liabilities.

See also
 Beverly Hills Post Beverly Hills Weekly Canyon News''

References

External links
Official site

Newspapers published in Beverly Hills, California
Free newspapers
Mass media in Los Angeles County, California
Newspapers published in Greater Los Angeles
1965 establishments in California
Weekly newspapers published in California